Leonard Albert Cuff (28 March 1866 – 9 October 1954) was a sportsman and sports administrator from New Zealand. Born in Christchurch, Cuff was an all-round sportsman who excelled at both athletics and cricket, his most significant sporting association is as the 12th (of 13) Founding Members of the International Olympic Committee, He was appointed to represent New Zealand and Australia from 1894 to 1905. Cuff is credited with instigating the first athletics competitions between Australia and New Zealand, and inter-provincial competitions within New Zealand. He managed New Zealand's first tour of an international athletics team.

Biography
Cuff captained the first New Zealand national cricket team, and at first-class level he played for both Auckland and Canterbury and later for Tasmania. He also played rugby for Canterbury.

In athletics Cuff won the New Zealand long jump title 3 times (1889, 1896 and 1897). In 1887 he was a founder and first Honorary Secretary of the New Zealand Amateur Athletic Association. Cuff managed the 5-man team (including himself) that went to England and France in 1892. In Paris, France he won a silver medal for hurdles at an International Athletics Meet. He was also an amateur golfer, winning the Tasmanian Amateur championship in 1904. Cuff died in Tasmania in 1954.

The Leonard Cuff Medal was established in 2000 to award people for their contribution to olympism in New Zealand. John Davies was awarded the medal in 2003, but it has since been discontinued.

See also
 List of Tasmanian representative cricketers
 List of Auckland representative cricketers

References

External links

"First On Field: Len Cuff"

1866 births
1954 deaths
New Zealand cricketers
New Zealand male long jumpers
Auckland cricketers
Canterbury cricketers
Tasmania cricketers
Pre-1930 New Zealand representative cricketers
International Olympic Committee members
New Zealand sports executives and administrators
Australian sports executives and administrators